Richard Grenfell Aylmer (11 January 1932 – 5 March 2023) was a British cross-country skier. He competed in the men's 50 kilometre event at the 1956 Winter Olympics.

Aylmer died on 5 March 2023, at the age of 91.

References

External links

1932 births
2023 deaths
British male cross-country skiers
Cross-country skiers at the 1956 Winter Olympics
Olympic cross-country skiers of Great Britain
Sportspeople from Plymouth, Devon